Ginta may refer to:

Ginta, Swiss singer, writer and influencer 
Ginta (Hunter × Hunter), a fictional character from the manga series Hunter × Hunter
Ginta,  a fictional character from the manga series Inuyasha
Ginta Lapiņa (born 1989), a Latvian model
Ginta Suou, a fictional character from the manga series Marmalade Boy
Ginta Toramizu, a fictional character from the manga series MÄR